Joel Nicolau Beltrán (born 23 December 1997 in Llofriu) is a Spanish cyclist, who currently rides for UCI ProTeam .

Major results
2021
 8th Overall CRO Race
2022
 1st  Mountains classification, Tour of Norway
 1st  Mountains classification, Tour de Luxembourg
 8th Overall Tour of Slovenia

References

External links

1997 births
Living people
Spanish male cyclists
People from Baix Empordà
Sportspeople from the Province of Girona
Cyclists from Catalonia
21st-century Spanish people